Nilanjana Datta is an Indian-born British mathematician. She is a Professor in Quantum Information Theory (Grade 11) in the Department of Applied Mathematics and Theoretical Physics at the University of Cambridge, and a Fellow of Pembroke College.

Born in the Indian state of West Bengal, Datta graduated from Jadavpur University with a Master of Science and did a Post-MSc at the Saha Institute of Nuclear Physics. In 1995 she obtained a PhD from ETH Zürich under the supervision of Jürg Fröhlich and Rudolf Morf, working on quantum statistical mechanics and the Quantum Hall effect. She then held postdoctoral positions at the CNRS Marseille, the Dublin Institute for Advanced Studies, the University of Strathclyde, and the École Polytechnique Fédérale de Lausanne. In 2001 she became an affiliated lecturer of the Faculty of Mathematics, University of Cambridge and a Fellow of Pembroke College.

After moving to Cambridge, Datta focused her research on the field of quantum information theory, contributing to topics such as quantum state transfer, memory effects in quantum information theory, and one-shot quantum information theory. Her collaborators include Artur Ekert, Jürg Fröhlich, Alexander Holevo, Richard Jozsa, Mary Beth Ruskai, Mark Wilde, and Andreas Winter.

Datta is the founder of the Beyond i.i.d. in Information Theory Conferences series, which started in January 2013 in Cambridge, UK and has continued on an annual basis since then. The main goal of the conference, in which Datta has played a central role, is to bring together the various research communities working on quantum Shannon theory, quantum resource theories, classical information theory, and mathematical physics related to entropies and information, in order to encourage the exchange of research and foster collaborations.

References

External links
 Women of Mathematics: an exhibition of portraits (University of Cambridge)

British women mathematicians
Indian women mathematicians
Living people
Year of birth missing (living people)
Academics of the Dublin Institute for Advanced Studies
Women scientists from West Bengal
21st-century British mathematicians
21st-century Indian mathematicians
Fellows of Pembroke College, Cambridge
Cambridge mathematicians
Jadavpur University alumni
ETH Zurich alumni
Quantum information scientists